Arcadio María Larraona Saralegui, C.M.F. (13 November 1887 – 7 May 1973) was a Spanish cardinal of the Catholic Church. He served as prefect of the Sacred Congregation of Rites from 1962 to 1968, and was elevated to the cardinalate in 1959.

Biography
Larraona Saralegui was born in Oteiza de la Solana, Navarra, to Patricio Larraona and his wife Bartolina Saralegui. He was the second of five children, his siblings being named Luis, Digna, Amparito (who died in infancy), and Amparo. Entering the Congregation of the Missionary Sons of the Immaculate Heart of Mary in 1899, Larraona Saralegui received his habit on 28 July 1902, and professed his final vows on 8 December 1903. After attending the University of Lleida, he was ordained to the priesthood by Archbishop Juan Soldevilla y Romero on 10 June 1911. Larraona Saralegui left for Rome on the following 24 October to study at the Pontifical Roman Athenaeum S. Apollinare (from where he obtained his doctorate in canon and civil law) and the University of Rome.

At his alma mater of the Pontifical Roman Athenaeum S. Apoillinare, he was made professor of institutions and history of civil law in 1919, and later served as professor of Roman law for forty years. Within the Claretians, he held the posts of counselor of the Italian province, visitor to Germany, and general assistant to Italy, Central Europe, and China. He was appointed consultor, in the Roman Curia, of the Sacred Congregation of the Oriental Churches on 8 October 1929, and of the Sacred Congregation of Religious on 3 December of that same year.

He was made undersecretary (27 November 1943) and later secretary (11 December 1949) of the Congregation of Religious. Before naming him as major penitentiary on 13 August 1961, Pope John XXIII created him cardinal-deacon of Ss. Biagio e Carlo ai Catinari in the consistory of 14 December 1959. He thus became the first Claretian member of the College of Cardinals; he required the permission of his order to change his brown habit for scarlet robes, provided they were made of wool. On 12 February 1962, Cardinal Larraona Saralegui was advanced to prefect of the Sacred Congregation of Rites and, in preparation of the Second Vatican Council, president of the Pontifical Commission of the Sacred Liturgy.

Cardinal Larraona Saralegui was appointed Titular Archbishop of Diocaesarea in Isauria on 5 April 1962, and received his episcopal consecration on the following 19 April from Pope John, with Cardinals Giuseppe Pizzardo and Benedetto Aloisi Masella serving as co-consecrators, in the Lateran Basilica. He resigned as titular archbishop, on 20 April of that same year. Attending all four sessions of the Second Vatican Council, he served as a cardinal elector in the 1963 papal conclave that selected Pope Paul VI. Larraona Saralegui, who had acquired the reputation of being sternly conservative, was cardinal protodeacon, or the most senior cardinal-deacon, from 26 June 1967 to 28 April 1969. He resigned as prefect of rites on 9 January 1968, and later exercised his right as a cardinal-deacon of ten years' standing to become a cardinal-priest (receiving the title of S. Cuore di Maria in the consistory of 28 April 1969).

Cardinal Larraona Saralegui died on 7 May 1973 at 10:10 am after a six-day broncho pulmonary infection in the Roman headquarters of the Claretians, at age 85. He is buried in the chapel of S. Giuseppe in the basilica of Sacro Cuore di Maria, according to his will.

Trivia
He participated in the preparation of the 1917 Code of Canon Law.
While a priest, he also taught at the Pontifical Urbaniana University and the "Scuola Pratica" of the Sacred Congregation of Religious.
Larraona Saralegui prepared the particular law of his congregation at its general chapter in 1922.
He collaborated in the preparation of the apostolic constitutions "Provida Mater Ecclesia" of 2 February 1947; "Sponsa Christi" of 21 November 1950; and "Sedes Sapientiæ of 31 May 1956.
Before dying he received a papal blessing.
During his body's exposition in the chapel of Collegio Claretianum on Via Aurelia, visitors included the Pope, numerous cardinals and Curial officials, diplomats to the Holy See, and many Spanish priests and religious.
A street in Pamplona, the capital city of Navarre, is named after him.

References

 O'Malley, John, What Happened at Vatican II, Cambridge, MA: Belknap Press of Harvard University, 2008.

External links
Cardinals of the Holy Roman Church
Catholic-Hierarchy 

1887 births
1973 deaths
20th-century Spanish cardinals
Protodeacons
Participants in the Second Vatican Council
Coetus Internationalis Patrum
Members of the Sacred Congregation for Rites
Major Penitentiaries of the Apostolic Penitentiary
Cardinals created by Pope John XXIII
Pontifical Gregorian University alumni